Ralf Schmitz (born 3 November 1974 in Leverkusen) is a German comedian and actor.

Life 
Schmitz works as an actor in German television.

Filmography 

 since 2003: Genial daneben – Die Comedy Arena
 2004–2006: Schillerstraße
 2002–2005: Die Dreisten Drei (bis Ende der 3. Staffel)
 2005: Sag die Wahrheit
 2005: Sarah Kuttner – Die Show
 2006: Schmitz komm raus (2006)
 2006–2008: Frag doch mal die Maus
 2006: Zimmer frei!
 2007: Eine große Nachtmusik
 2007: Löwenzahn
 2007: Die Sendung mit der Maus
 2007/2008: Ein Herz für Kinder
 2008: Kicken für Kinder
 2008: Inas Nacht
 2008: Happy Otto!
 2008: Lachen mit Otto Waalkes – Der Ostfriesische Götterbote wird 60 
 2008: Jukebox Helden
 2009: Schmitz in the City
 2010: Bei Kerner
 2010: Ralf Schmitz live! Schmitzophren
 2011: Ralf Schmitz Live (RTL)
 since 2013: Take Me Out
 2014: Hotel Zuhause

Films 
 2004: 7 Zwerge – Männer allein im Wald (as Sunny)
 2005: Der kleine Eisbär 2 – Die geheimnisvolle Insel (dubbing, Pepe)
 2005: Urmel aus dem Eis (as Ping Pinguin)
 2006: Ab durch die Hecke (dubbing, Hammy)
 2006: Oh, wie schön ist Panama (Schnuddel)
 2006: 7 Zwerge – Der Wald ist nicht genug (as Sunny)
 2007: Shaun das Schaf (music video)
 2008: Kung Fu Panda (dubbing, Master Crane)
 2010: Konferenz der Tiere (dubbing, Billy)
 2011: Kung Fu Panda 2 (dubbing, Master Crane)
 2014: The 7th Dwarf (as Sunny)

Books 
 Schmitz' Katze – Hunde haben Herrchen, Katzen haben Personal. S. Fischer Verlag, September 2008.  
 Schmitz' Mama: Andere haben Probleme, ich hab' Familie. S. Fischer Verlag, September 2011.

Awards 
 2003: Deutscher Comedypreis as Bester Newcomer
 2005: Eins Live Krone as Best Comedian

External links 

 Personal website
 
 Spiegel: Alles für die Katz' (German)
 WAZ: Mama - Das unerklärliche Phänomen (German)

1974 births
Living people
People from Leverkusen
German male television actors
German male film actors
RTL Group people
ARD (broadcaster) people